The 1927 Tempe State Bulldogs football team was an American football team that represented Tempe State Teachers College (later renamed Arizona State University) as an independent during the 1927 college football season. In their fifth season under head coach Aaron McCreary, the Bulldogs compiled a 2–3–1 record and outscored their opponents by a combined total of 63 to 50. The team's games included a scoreless tie with UTEP and a 25–3 loss to Loyola Marymount. Bill Griffith was the team captain.

Schedule

References

Tempe State
Arizona State Sun Devils football seasons
Tempe State Bulldogs football